Provincial Highway  4 is a provincial highway that runs from Dayuan to Longtan in Taoyuan City.

Route Description
Highway 4 begins at the junction of PH 15 in Dayuan, near Taiwan Taoyuan International Airport. The highway then continues through Luzhu, and is one of the main roads in Nankan (南崁) area, one of the fastest-growing suburbs in Taoyuan City. After the intersection with Freeway 1, the road enters Central Taoyuan as Chunri Road (春日路). The road then runs concurrently with PH 1 as Sanmin Road (三民路) in downtown Taoyuan until PH 1 splits and becomes Zhonghua Road (中華路). Highway 4 continues as Sanmin Road until it reaches Bade, where it becomes Jieshou Road (介壽路) and crosses Freeway 2. The road then enters the suburban district of Daxi, where it runs concurrent with PH 3 before splitting near old town Daxi. The highway continues and ends at the north rim of Shimen Dam in Longtan.

Major intersections

See also

References

External links

Highways in Taiwan
Geography of Taoyuan City
Taoyuan District